The following is a list of towns in England and Wales which formed local board districts under the Public Health Act 1848 or local government districts under the Local Government Act 1858.

Note for table:
'LBD' stands for local board district
'LGD' stands for local government district
'RSD' stands for rural sanitary district
'UD' stands for urban district
'RD' stands for rural district
'MB' stands for municipal borough
'CB' stands for county borough.

1848-58

1858-69

†Not put into practical operation until 1866.

1870-79
When the Public Health Act 1875 came into force in 1875, all local board districts and local government districts were designated urban sanitary districts, alongside the newly created rural sanitary districts; see list: Rural sanitary districts formed in England and Wales 1875–94.

†Had adopted the Act in 1866.
††Had adopted the Act in 1861.

1880-89

1890-94

References

Local boards 1848
Local boards 1848
1848
1848
Local government in the United Kingdom
Local boards 1848
Local boards 1848